Sory Ersa Siregar (December 4, 1951 – December 29, 2003) was an Indonesian journalist working for RCTI television network who was killed when covering the conflict in Aceh in 2003. He left a wife, Tuty Komala Bintang Hasibuan and three children, Ridhwan Siregar, Fitrah Siregar, dan Sarah Siregar.

Before working for RCTI in 1993, he had been working in PT. Fesda, PT. Satmarindo, Susana magazine, and Keluarga Magazine. Ersa started his career as a translator/producer, and then changed into the regional coordinator, then local coordinator (KorLip) covering tourism, lifestyle and entertainment. He also began to work as legal coordinator (KorBid), covering urban crime from 16 November 2001 until he was killed.

Death 
On July 1, 2003, he and his cameraman, Ferry Santoro, were reported missing in Langsa, East Aceh.
On July 5, their car was found in Langsa, East Aceh, an area well known for being GAM base.
On December 29, Siregar's body was found shot in Kuala Maniham, East Aceh.

References 

1951 births
2003 deaths
Television reporters and correspondents
Indonesian journalists
People of Batak descent
20th-century journalists